Luis Schenone (born 27 April 1940) is an Argentine sailor. He competed at the 1960 Summer Olympics, the 1972 Summer Olympics and the 1975 Pan American Games

References

External links
 

1940 births
Living people
Argentine male sailors (sport)
Olympic sailors of Argentina
Sailors at the 1968 Summer Olympics – Dragon
Sailors at the 1972 Summer Olympics – Star
Sportspeople from Buenos Aires